Aniek van Koot defeated Sabine Ellerbrock in the final, 6–1, 1–6, 7–5 to win the women's singles wheelchair tennis title at the 2013 Australian Open.

Esther Vergeer was the two-time reigning champion, but did not participate. She would announce her retirement from professional wheelchair tennis in February of that year.

The 2013 Optus Australian Open Wheelchair women's singles featured eight players and had two seeds and one wild card. All matches were played as best-of-three-sets.

Draw

References
 Draw

Wheelchair Women's Singles
2013 Women's Singles